Reg Gleeson (born 1 May 1950, full name Reginald Gleeson) is  a former Australian rules footballer who played with South Melbourne in the Victorian Football League (VFL) between 1970 and 1976. 

He joined South Melbourne in 1969 and made his senior VFL debut in 1970, shortly before his 20th birthday. His shirt number was 27 and he initially played as a wingman before going onto become a half back flanker. Over the course of his career with South Melbourne he played 128 games and scored 11 goals. He played his last match with South Melbourne in 1976, at the age of 26.

Gleeson worked in the transport industry throughout his football playing career.

Notes

External links 		
		
		
		
		
		
		
Living people		
1950 births		
		
Australian rules footballers from New South Wales
Sydney Swans players